Kyle Philip Wilson (born 14 November 1985) is an English footballer. He has previously played for Crewe Alexandra, Macclesfield Town, FC United of Manchester, Chester and Bangor City. He also represented England U18 and U19 earning 14 youth international caps.

Career

Crewe Alexandra
Wilson started his career rising through the youth ranks at Crewe Alexandra. In October 2005, he was loaned out to Conference National side Altrincham, to boost his development. He played five games for the club.

Making 2 appearances for Crewe, he was released from his contract at the end of the 2005–06 season.

Barrow
After leaving Crewe, Wilson had a brief trial at Wrexham but later in the Summer of 2006, he signed for Barrow who were managed at the time by his father, Phil Wilson. Wilson suffered an anterior mediate cruciate ligament injury in September 2006, forcing him to miss the rest of the season. He left the club following the dismissal of his father as manager in November 2007.

Droylsden
On 5 January 2008, he made an appearance for Conference outfit Droylsden, in the 2–1 defeat to Crawley Town.

FC United of Manchester
He spent 2008–09 with FC United of Manchester, where he excelled, scoring 25 goals in 32 games. He returned to the Football League in May 2009, signing with Macclesfield Town.

Macclesfield Town
He made his debut in the 4–0 defeat by Notts County at Moss Rose on 15 August 2009. He was a late substitute for Matthew Tipton.

On 26 January 2010, it was announced Wilson was rejoining FC United of Manchester on loan, for a month. His loan period was extended but he was recalled his parent club in early March.

He was released by Macclesfield, along with 10 other players at the end of the 2009–10 season.

Hyde
On 20 July 2010, Wilson signed for Conference North side Hyde. He became Hyde's sixth signing of summer 2010. He made his official debut on 14 August when he saw his team lose 5–0 to AFC Telford United at the New Bucks Head. On 1 October 2010, he was released by Hyde due to continuas injury problems.

Chester
On 30 September 2010 he joined Chester. He went on to make 35 appearances in total, scoring 7 goals. He was released by the club in May 2011.

Bangor City
In June 2011 he joined Bangor City for the 2011–12 campaign.

Nantwich Town
He returned to the English non-league system in July 2012, signing with Nantwich Town.

References

External links

1985 births
Living people
English footballers
Association football forwards
Crewe Alexandra F.C. players
Witton Albion F.C. players
Altrincham F.C. players
Droylsden F.C. players
Macclesfield Town F.C. players
Nantwich Town F.C. players
English Football League players
National League (English football) players
F.C. United of Manchester players
Hyde United F.C. players
Barrow A.F.C. players
Chester F.C. players
Bangor City F.C. players
Conwy Borough F.C. players